The Systems Engineering Body of Knowledge (SEBoK), formally known as Guide to the Systems Engineering Body of Knowledge, is a wiki-based collection of key knowledge sources and references for systems engineering. The SEBoK is a curated wiki meaning that the content is managed by an editorial board, and updated on a regular basis. This wiki is a collaboration of three organizations: 1) International Council on Systems Engineering (INCOSE), 2) IEEE Systems Council, and 3) Stevens Institute of Technology. The most recent version (v.2.5) was released on October 15, 2021.

History 
The Guide was developed over three years, from 2009 to 2012, through the contributions of 70 authors worldwide. During this period, three prototype versions were created. The first prototype (v.0.25) was a document that was released for review in September 2010. However, the final versions were all published online as agreed by the authors in January 2011. This switch to a wiki-based SEBoK began with v.0.50.

The first version of the SEBoK for public use was published online in September 2012. The initial release was named 2012 product of the year by the International Council on Systems Engineering. Since then, the guide had several revisions and minor updates leading to the 19th release, as of November 2018. Version 1.7, released on October 27, 2016, added a new Healthcare Systems Engineering knowledge area.

Knowledge areas 
According to the site, the guide has a total of 26 knowledge areas distributed among the different parts. However, the majority of these knowledge areas can be grouped to form nine general knowledge areas. The general and specific knowledge areas are:

 Science & Technology Knowledge
 Introduction to Life Cycle Processes
 Life Cycle Models
 Concept Definition
 Domain Technology Knowledge
 System Definition
 System Realization
 System Deployment and Use
 Operational Environment Knowledge
 Engineering Discipline/ Specialty Knowledge
 Systems Engineering and Software Engineering
 Systems Engineering and Project Management
 Systems Engineering and Industrial Engineering
 Systems Engineering and Specialty Engineering
 Sector & Enterprise Knowledge
 Product Systems Engineering
 Service Systems Engineering
 Enterprise Systems Engineering
 Systems of Systems (SoS)
 Healthcare Systems Engineering
 Management & Leadership Knowledge
 Enabling Businesses and Enterprises
 Enabling Teams
 Enabling Individuals
 Systems Engineering Management
 Product and Service Life Management
 Education & Training Knowledge
 People & Competency Knowledge
 Systems Engineering Standards
 Social/ Systems Science Knowledge
 Systems Fundamentals
 Systems Science
 Systems Thinking
 Representing Systems with Models
 Systems Approach Applied to Engineered Systems

References

External links 
 Guide to the Systems Engineering Body of Knowledge (SEBoK)

Bodies of knowledge
Systems engineering